Lotus Blossom is an album by the American musician Kenny Burrell, released in 1995. Burrell supported the album by touring with the 1996 "Guitar Summit" package, with Jorma Kaukonen, Stanley Jordan, and Manuel Barrueco.

Production
Recorded in May 1995, the album was produced by John Burk. Burrell used bassist Ray Drummond on the duo tracks, and Drummond and drummer Yoron Israel on the trio tracks; six of the tracks were performed solo. "Satin Doll" and "Warm Valley" are versions of the Duke Ellington compositions. The title track was written by Billy Strayhorn.

Critical reception

The Sun-Sentinel wrote that "Burrell's elegant phrasing exudes warmth and lyricism." The Los Angeles Times stated that "Burrell alternates rich harmonic statements with single string lines filled with arpeggiated phrasing spelling out the underlying chords."

Newsday concluded that, "for Burrell, Ellington's music isn't a hallowed museum, but a palpable, living presence, capable of sustaining intimate, rewarding dialogue." The Omaha World-Herald deemed the album "quiet, subtle music rendered in always creative fashion by a player who should be called Mr. Taste."

AllMusic wrote that "although the tunes are superior, none of these versions are definitive and the mellow results rarely rise above the level of background music." The Daily Breeze listed Lotus Blossom among the best mainstream jazz albums of 1995.

Track listing

References

Kenny Burrell albums
1995 albums